Draparnaudia is a genus of air-breathing land snails, terrestrial pulmonate gastropod mollusks in the superfamily Partuloidea.

Draparnaudia is the only genus in the family Draparnaudiidae.

Both the family name and the genus name of these snails were created to honor the 18th century French malacologist Jacques Philippe Raymond Draparnaud.

Distribution
This genus is endemic to New Caledonia, in Melanesia and - probably introduced - to Vanuatu.

Taxonomy 
The family Draparnaudiidae is classified within the informal group Orthurethra, itself belonging to the clade Stylommatophora within the clade Eupulmonata (according to the taxonomy of the Gastropoda by Bouchet & Rocroi, 2005). Draparnaudia is the type genus of the family Draparnaudiidae.

Draparnaudiidae consists of one genus with six species:
 Draparnaudia anniae Tillier & Mordan, 1995 
 Draparnaudia gassiesi Pilsbry, 1902
 Draparnaudia michaudi Montrouzier, 1859 - type species
 Draparnaudia singularis (Pfeiffer, 1855)
 Draparnaudia subnecata Tillier & Mordan, 1995
 Draparnaudia walkeri Sykes, 1903

References

Draparnaudiidae
Taxonomy articles created by Polbot